Hilary Paweł Januszewski, O.Carm (June 11, 1907, in Krajenki – March 25, 1945, in Dachau concentration camp), was a Polish priest, Carmelite friar of the Ancient Observance and Catholic priest, who was sent by the Nazi authorities to occupied Poland to the Dachau concentration camp, where he managed to survive until 1945.

Januszewski studied in Rome receiving a Licentiate in Theology in 1935 from the Pontifical University of St. Thomas Aquinas, Angelicum.

In February 1945, in the course of a large outbreak of typhoid, Januszewski volunteered to serve those who were dying in an isolated makeshift building because, as he said, he was more needed there. He contracted the disease himself and died there.

Januszewski is one of 108 Martyrs of World War II who were beatified as a group by Pope John Paul II in 1999.

References

External links 
"Bl. Hilary Januszewski, Priest and Martyr (m)" , Order of the brothers of the Most Blessed Virgin Mary of Mt. Carmel 

1907 births
1945 deaths
Discalced Carmelites
20th-century Polish Roman Catholic priests
Polish civilians killed in World War II
Polish people who died in Dachau concentration camp
Deaths from typhoid fever
Carmelite beatified people
Polish beatified people
Beatifications by Pope John Paul II
Catholic saints and blesseds of the Nazi era